George Harry Yardley III (November 3, 1928 – August 12, 2004) was an American basketball player. He was the first player in NBA history to score 2,000 points in one season, breaking the 1,932-point record held by George Mikan. Yardley was enshrined in the Naismith Memorial Basketball Hall of Fame in 1996.

Early life
A two-time All-American at Stanford University, Yardley was a member of Phi Kappa Psi fraternity, and earned the nickname "Yardbird" due to the chores he was required to complete by his fraternity brothers. The nickname was later shortened to "Bird".  After his three-year career at Stanford, Yardley played one year of AAU basketball and served in the United States Navy for two years. During his navy stint, Yardley's amateur team won the national A.A.U. championship in 1951, with Yardley being selected the national amateur player-of-the-year. He was drafted by the NBA Fort Wayne Pistons in 1950.

NBA career
At 6'5", Yardley was a good-sized forward in 1950s basketball and was described as "an offensive-minded player with a knack for scoring" in his Naismith Memorial Basketball Hall of Fame biography.

Described as a "flamboyant" and "gregarious" player who "never did anything without flair", Yardley had a stellar 7-year career, making the NBA All-Star team every year except for his rookie season.  He led the Fort Wayne Pistons to two NBA Finals before the team moved to Detroit in 1957.  In '57–58, the Pistons' first year in Detroit, Yardley led the league in scoring, averaging 27.8 points per game, and tallied 2001 points, just enough to make him the first NBA player to score 2000 points in a season.  That year, Yardley also set NBA records for most free throws attempted (808) and most free throws made (655), and was named to the All-NBA First Team for the only time in his career.

Following a sixth All-Star season in 1959–1960, in which he averaged 20.2 points per game, George Yardley retired from basketball at the age of 31.  He was the first player in NBA history to retire after averaging at least 20 PPG in his final year.  Although Alex Groza had a 21.7 PPG average in his final NBA season in 1951, his career ended as a result of a lifelong ban, instead of a voluntary retirement like that of Yardley's. He made a brief comeback in the short-lived American Basketball League with the Los Angeles Jets in 1961–62.

Post-basketball career
Making use of his engineering degree from Stanford, Yardley started his own engineering company in California following his retirement from the NBA.  In 1996, Yardley was elected to the Naismith Memorial Basketball Hall of Fame as a player.

In a tribute to Yardley posted after his death, Pete Newell later said "George Yardley embodies what the Hall of Fame is all about.  A marvelous athlete who made full use of his natural talents, a demeanor on the court a coach admires, and a life off the court and after his basketball career ended that has been very successful."

Yardley died of amyotrophic lateral sclerosis, also known as Lou Gehrig's disease, at the age of 75.

NBA career statistics

Regular season

Playoffs

References

External links
George Yardley Company, industrial supply retailer
Stanford University Hall-of-Fame
Naismith Memorial Basketball HOF

1928 births
2004 deaths
Amateur Athletic Union men's basketball players
American Basketball League (1961–62) players
Basketball players from California
Burials at Pacific View Memorial Park
Neurological disease deaths in California
Deaths from motor neuron disease
Detroit Pistons players
Fort Wayne Pistons draft picks
Fort Wayne Pistons players
Naismith Memorial Basketball Hall of Fame inductees
National Basketball Association All-Stars
Sportspeople from Orange County, California
Stanford Cardinal men's basketball players
Syracuse Nationals players
American men's basketball players
Newport Harbor High School alumni
Forwards (basketball)
Guards (basketball)
United States Navy sailors